Demetrios Nicolaides  is a Canadian politician who was elected in the 2019 Alberta general election to represent the electoral district of Calgary-Bow in the 30th Alberta Legislature. He is a member of the United Conservative Party. On April 30, 2019, he was appointed to be the Minister of Advanced Education in the Executive Council of Alberta.

Early life and career 
Nicolaides become involved in student life at the University of Calgary when he was acclaimed as the VP Academic of the Students’ Union in their 2003 General Election. During his time at the SU, Demetrios
began an initiative to identify what factors students believe is critical to maintaining a high-quality post-secondary education. As a result of the survey and its findings, the University Of Calgary Board Of
Governors agreed to provide the Students Union with $1 million annually to fund initiatives that
students believe will improve the quality of their education. Funding for this initiative was originally
secured in 2003 and allocated for its first disbursement in 2004 and since 2004 the program has
continued and grew to $1.5 million by 2005. Nicolaides convocated from the University of Calgary in
2005 with a Bachelor of Arts in History and International Relations. He completed his Master in Peace
and Conflict Studies from the European University Centre for Peace and Conflict Studies and his PhD in
political science from the University of Cyprus, where he is recognized as one of the institution's most
notable alumni. His PhD focused on the effectiveness of approaches to peace education in protracted
ethno-nationalist based conflicts. Other research work includes the Cyprus conflict, Cypriot foreign and
defence policy and EU integration politics.

Nicolaides was elected as vice-president communications for PC Alberta at the party's 2016 AGM in Red
Deer and served until the successful merger of the party with the Wildrose to form the new United
Conservative Party of Alberta. Demetrios squashed attempts to disqualify Jason Kenney's candidacy for
leader of the party. Nicolaides volunteer extensively on Jason Kenney's PC leadership campaign, the
merger of the Wildrose and PC Alberta, and Jason Kenney's UCP leadership campaign. In 2018,
Demetrios sought the UCP nomination in Calgary-Bow and faced off against many challengers including
Lisa Davis, who retained Nicolaides as her campaign manager during her 2017 election as a school
trustee to the Calgary Board of Education in 2017. Nicolaides successfully secured the nomination
against Lisa Davis, Cheryl Durkee, and 2015 PC Alberta candidate Calgary-Bow and 2016 PC Alberta
leadership candidate Byron Nelson on October 23, 2018.

Post-secondary funding and reform 
In January 2020, Nicolaides announced that funding for post-secondary institutions would be based on
performance against key metrics. Three-year Investment Management Agreements would be signed
with individual institutions and each would see 15% of funding at risk in year one, 30% in year two and
40% in year three. The onset of the COVID-19 pandemic prompted the government to delay
implementation of the new model. Nicolaides moved forward with a new implantation timeline that
would see post-secondary institutions sign a one-year Investment Management Agreement, with 5% of
funding at risk against a single metric on work-integrated learning.

Supporting the trades 
As Minister of Advanced Education, Nicolaides prioritized additional support for trades and
apprenticeship education. This included establishing a new scholarship for high school students who
show promise in the trades. The $1.5 million High School Apprenticeship Scholarship, will help more
students access post-secondary educational opportunities in the trades. $10 million in new funding
was also provided to Women Building Futures, $6 million per year to CAREERS: The Next Generation
and $2 million annually to Skills Canada Alberta. In addition, a taskforce of experts in the trades and
apprenticeship education was convened to provide the government with additional recommendations
to elevate the trades and promote apprenticeship education pathways. Nicolaides also established the
Trades Hall of Fame and introduced Bill 67, the Skilled Trades and Apprenticeship Education Act that
overhauled Alberta's trades and apprenticeship legislative and regulatory framework.

COVID-19 
The onset of the COVID-19 pandemic caused many of Alberta's post-secondary institutions to move to
on-learning which continued throughout the majority of the 2020/21 academic year.
Nicolaides provided support to Alberta's five First Nations colleges who each received an additional
$100,000 in one-time funding for COVID-19 supports. The grant was used to address technology and
WiFi access, support online programming development and delivery ad assists with improve cleaning
protocols. Additional supports were also provided to unemployed apprentices as eligible apprentices
would now received $500 more during their classroom instruction period to assist apprentices who are
unemployed continue their apprenticeship program.
In March 2021, citing increasing vaccination rates, Nicolaides issued a statement to post-secondary
institutions to prepare to return to in-person learning for the upcoming 2021/22 Fall academic
semester. While many institutions indeed returned to in-person learning, the rise of the more
infectious Omicron variant prompted many of Alberta's post-secondary institutions to return to on-line
learning in October and December.
By the spring of 2022, the Omicron variant had abated and the Government of Alberta moved forward
with a plan to remove COVID-19 measures. On February 8, 2022, Premier Jason Kenney announced that
the proof-of-vaccination program would end at midnight and other COVID-19 measures would be
removed by March 1, 2022. Following this announcement Nicolaides directed post-secondary
institutions to remove their vaccine and mask requirements by March 1, 2022.

Establishing Red Deer Polytechnic and Northwestern Polytechnic 
In February 2018, Advanced Education Minister Marlin Schmidt announced that Grande Prairie Regional
College would transition to a university in order to offer degrees in the local community. In 2019, it
was further announced that Red Deer College would also transition to a university. However, in 2021,
Nicolaides noted that the two institutions may not transitions to universities as planned as a larger
review of Alberta's post-secondary system was underway. In the end, both institutions transitioned to
Polytechnics.

Targeted enrolment expansion 
Budget 2022 committed $600 million over three years to address labour shortages through the Alberta
at Work initiative. This included $171 million, over three years, to create 10,000 new post-secondary
spaces in high-demand programs. Approximately $4 million was provided to Lakeland College, Keyano
College and Portage College to create 400 new spaces, $850,000 was provided to Northern Lakes
College and Northwestern Polytechnic to create 340 new spaces primarily in health care related
programming, $5.3 million was provided to the University of Lethbridge, Lethbridge College and
Medicine Hat College to create 184 new spaces, $5.5 million was provided to Red Deer Polytechnic,
Burman University and Olds College to create 900 new post-secondary spaces, Edmonton-area post-
secondary institutions including the University of Alberta, Concordia University, MacEwan university,
NAIT and Norquest collectively received a total of $70 million to create 4,900 new post-secondary
spaces in business, engineering, health, IT and early childhood learning and Calgary-area post-
secondary institutions received $84.6 million to create 3,000 new spaces in aviation, quantum
computing, and healthcare at Ambrose University, Bow Valley College, Mount Royal University, SAIT, St.
Mary's University and the University of Calgary. Nicolaides has claimed that the 10,000 new spaces
created through targeted enrolment expansion initiative represent the largest targeted seat increase in
Alberta history. In addition, Budget 2022 included a $59 million capital investment to the University Of
Calgary Faculty Of Veterinary Medicine to double the number of vet grads and $41 million to continue
redevelopment of SAIT's John Ware building, home of its award-winning culinary program.

References

United Conservative Party MLAs
Living people
21st-century Canadian politicians
Canadian people of Greek Cypriot descent
Members of the Executive Council of Alberta
Politicians from Calgary
1982 births